Ammurapi (Hittite: 𒄠𒈬𒊏𒁉 am-mu-ra-pí) was the last Bronze Age ruler and king (c. 1215 to 1180 BC) of the ancient Syrian city of Ugarit. Ammurapi was a contemporary of the Hittite King Suppiluliuma II. He wrote a preserved vivid letter RS 18.147 (Nougayrol et al. (1968 Ugaritica V): 87-9 no. 24) in response to a plea for assistance from the king of Alashiya.

Ammurapi wrote:

This letter dramatically highlights the desperate situation facing Ugarit while it was also under attack by the invading Sea Peoples.

Ugarit would become one of the many states of the ancient Near East that were destroyed or abandoned during the Bronze Age collapse.

Suppiluliuma II was responsible for the divorce settlement between Ammurapi and a Hittite woman, but it did not cause a problem between the Kingdom of Ugarit and the Hittite Empire; instead it demonstrated the relationship between both kingdoms.

References

Bibliography 

 

Ugaritic kings
13th-century BC rulers
12th-century BC rulers
Late Bronze Age collapse
13th-century BC people